Natalya Valeryevna Bochina (born 4 January 1962) is a retired Soviet athlete, who competed mainly in the 200 metres. Bochina trained at Dynamo in Leningrad.

Bochina was born in Leningrad and was relatively young, at 18 years of age, when she competed for the USSR in the 1980 Summer Olympics held in Moscow, Soviet Union. However, she proved to the world just how fast she was in the 200 metres final by just claiming the silver medal in a time of 22.19 seconds. She then helped her teammates Vera Komisova, Lyudmila Maslakova and Vera Anisimova to the silver medal in the 4 × 100 metres relay.

References
sports-reference

1962 births
Living people
Soviet female sprinters
Russian female sprinters
Dynamo sports society athletes
Athletes (track and field) at the 1980 Summer Olympics
Olympic silver medalists for the Soviet Union
Olympic athletes of the Soviet Union
Athletes from Saint Petersburg
Medalists at the 1980 Summer Olympics
Olympic silver medalists in athletics (track and field)
Olympic female sprinters